Lewis Smith Carr (August 15, 1872 – June 15, 1954) was a shortstop and third baseman in Major League Baseball. In 1901, he played "alongside Honus Wagner for a championship Pittsburgh Pirates team."

Carr attended and played baseball at Syracuse University, later coaching the school's baseball team from 1910 to 1942. The Orangemen were 275–268 with Carr at the helm. In 1952, the school's baseball diamond was renamed in his honor.

References

External links

 "Profile: Lew Carr," Cayuga-Owasco Lakes Historical Society
 Gersbacher, Ron. (2012, January 24). "History of Syracuse Baseball," ch. 10

1872 births
1954 deaths
Major League Baseball shortstops
Pittsburgh Pirates players
Baseball players from New York (state)
Minor league baseball managers
Toronto Royals players
Schenectady Electricians players
Troy Washerwomen players
Troy Trojans (minor league) players
Waverly Wagonmakers players
Toronto Maple Leafs (International League) players
Scranton Miners players
Syracuse Stars (minor league baseball) players
Shreveport Pirates (baseball) players
Syracuse Orangemen baseball players
Syracuse Orangemen baseball coaches
Syracuse Chiefs players